Past Worn Searching is the debut studio album by American indie rock band Rainer Maria, released in 1997.

Critical reception
The Wisconsin State Journal thought that "plaintive ballads like 'Viva Anger, Viva Hate' and 'Sickbed' are impressively moody, opening with soothing sounds before building to shattering crescendos."

In 2006, The New York Times wrote that the album "captures the slightly chaotic sound of a band that was willfully out of place: the trio was often the wimpiest act at Midwestern punk and hardcore concerts."

Track listing
All songs by Rainer Maria.

"Tinfoil" – 4:55
"Half Past April" – 4:22
"Viva Anger, Viva Hate" – 3:12
"Always More Often" – 5:33
"Sickbed" – 5:49
"Never In Anger" – 4:58
"New York, 1955" – 4:18
"Homeopathy" – 4:41
"Put Me to Sleep" – 4:00

References 

Rainer Maria albums
1997 albums